A gubernatorial election was held on 17 April 1963 to elect the Governor of Saga Prefecture. Incumbent Sunao Ikeda won the election uncontested.

Candidates
 - incumbent Governor of Saga Prefecture, age 61

Results

References

Saga gubernatorial elections
1963 elections in Japan